Ahoada East I Assembly constituency is a constituency of the Rivers State House of Assembly, Nigeria.

Members of the House of Assembly
1999: Hon. Osinakachukwu Ideozu
2003: Hon. Douglas Ikerechi
2007: Hon. Ewor Nname 
2011: Hon. Ewor Nname
2015: Hon. Martyns Mannah

References

Assembly constituencies of Rivers State